Feuchtwanger Stable is a historic stable building located in Fort Greene, Brooklyn, New York, New York. It was built in 1888 in the Romanesque Revival style. It is a three-story brick structure trimmed with stone and terra cotta.  The first floor features three wide, round arches that once served as entrances for horses. The building has housed a candy factory, a storage warehouse, and an auto repair garage. It was converted into loft condominiums in 1988.

It was listed on the National Register of Historic Places in 1986.

References

Buildings and structures on the National Register of Historic Places in New York City
Buildings and structures in Brooklyn
Romanesque Revival architecture in New York City
Infrastructure completed in 1888
Fort Greene, Brooklyn
National Register of Historic Places in Brooklyn
Stables in the United States
Agricultural buildings and structures on the National Register of Historic Places in New York (state)
Agricultural buildings and structures on the National Register of Historic Places